Clara Hagman (born 9 July 1991), known professionally as Clara Mae, is a Swedish singer and songwriter currently signed to Big Beat and Atlantic Records. She has released two major label singles: "I'm Not Her" and "I Forgot". From 2009 to 2012, Mae was a member of the Swedish pop group Ace of Base. In 2016, she was featured on and co-wrote the Kream song "Taped Up Heart", which peaked at number 21 on the Billboard Hot Dance/Electronic Songs chart.

Early life
Clara Mae was born on 9 July 1991 in Gävle, Sweden. In 2002, she participated in the Lilla Melodifestivalen songwriting competition, performing an original song, "Hej, vem är du", and placing fourth. She also studied jazz vocals and piano for three years. She moved to Stockholm to pursue a career in music.

Career
Early in her career, Clara Mae worked with producers David Guetta and Tiësto. In 2008, she appeared on the singing competition program Next Star where she performed Whitney Houston's "I Will Always Love You" and placed second. The following year, she competed on another singing competition program, Idol 2009. She performed Duffy's "Warwick Avenue" for her audition and Oh Laura's "Release Me" during the semi-final round, but failed to advance to the finals. Also in 2009, Clara Mae was recruited by Ulf Ekberg and Jonas Berggren to join Ace of Base. She and fellow new member Julia Williamson replaced former members Jenny and Linn Berggren and began recording a new album with the band in September 2009. The band released The Golden Ratio in September 2010, and Mae officially left Ace of Base in 2012.

In 2014, she officially adopted "Clara Mae" as her stage name and released her first song as a solo artist, "Changing Faces." She had been going by her birth name, Clara Hagman, prior to that. In 2015, she released a new single, "Avalon". In 2016, she was featured on the Steve Void & No Mondays song "Chemistry", and also released another solo single, "Strip".

That same year, she co-wrote and was featured on the Kream song "Taped Up Heart", which would go on to peak at number 21 on the Billboard Hot Dance/Electronic Songs chart and number 70 on the Swedish chart. She also performed at the Eurovision Song Contest 2016 as a backing vocalist for Gabriela Gunčíková, who represented the Czech Republic that year with "I Stand". Mae signed to Big Beat Records (an imprint of Atlantic Records) in 2017. She released her first major label single, "I'm Not Her", in November of that year. She released an acoustic version of the song in January 2018. Clara Mae was a featured artist on the Felix Jaehn song "Better", which was released in February 2018. Her second single on Big Beat, "I Forgot", was released in March 2018.

Discography

Studio albums

Extended plays

Singles

As lead artist

As featured artist

References

External links

Official website

Living people
Swedish women singers
Swedish pop singers
1991 births
Ace of Base members
Big Beat Records (American record label) artists